Real Jean "Alfie" Turcotte (born June 5, 1965) is an American former ice hockey player.

Biography
Turcotte was born in Gary, Indiana, and raised in Holt, Michigan. As a youth, he played in the 1978 Quebec International Pee-Wee Hockey Tournament with a minor ice hockey team from Detroit.

Turcotte was selected by the Montreal Canadiens in the 1983 NHL Entry Draft.  He played for the Canadiens, Winnipeg Jets, Orlando Solar Bears, Baltimore Skipjacks and Washington Capitals. Turcotte represented the United States at the 1984 World Junior Ice Hockey Championships and at the 1986 World Ice Hockey Championships.

His younger brother, Jeff Turcotte, had a brief minor professional stint in the East Coast Hockey League (ECHL) and Sunshine Hockey League (SuHL). Turcotte's son, Alex, was drafted 5th overall by the Los Angeles Kings in the 2019 NHL Entry Draft.

Career statistics

Regular season and playoffs

International

References

External links

Profile at hockeydraftcentral.com

1965 births
American men's ice hockey centers
Arkansas Glaciercats players
Baltimore Skipjacks players
Frankfurt Lions players
Ice hockey players from Indiana
Indianapolis Ice players
Living people
Moncton Hawks players
Montreal Canadiens draft picks
Montreal Canadiens players
Nanaimo Islanders players
National Hockey League first-round draft picks
Nova Scotia Oilers players
Orlando Solar Bears (IHL) players
Portland Winterhawks players
Schwenninger Wild Wings players
Sherbrooke Canadiens players
Sportspeople from Gary, Indiana
Winnipeg Jets (1979–1996) players
Washington Capitals players